Football was contested for men only at the 1987 Summer Universiade in Zagreb, Yugoslavia.

References
 Universiade football medalists on HickokSports

U
1987 Summer Universiade
Football at the Summer Universiade
1987